Luis García Postigo (born 1 June 1969) is a Mexican former professional footballer who played as a forward.

Today he is a football commentator for TV Azteca (called "Doctor Garcia") and narrates alongside Argentine Mexican commentator Christian Martinoli.

Club career
García came out of the Pumas' youth groups as a great prospect. He debuted when he was 17 years old in 1987 with the Pumas team. He also played with Atlético Madrid, and Real Sociedad of Spain's Liga de Fútbol Profesional. Returning from Europe he continued his career in Club América, Atlante, Guadalajara, Morelia, and Puebla. He scored a total of 156 goals in the Mexico Primera División, and led it in scoring three times. He retired from association football in 2001. He last played with Puebla. He became top-scorer in the 1990–91, 1991–92, and the 1997 winter tournaments.

Atlético Madrid
Luis Garcia arrived at Atletico Madrid in 1992, scoring 17 goals in his debut season with the Spanish Club. After struggling in his second season, he was loaned out to Real Sociedad.

International career
For the national team, he compiled 77 caps, scoring 28 goals and played in the 1994 World Cup, scoring both Mexico goals in their first round victory versus the Republic of Ireland. He was the tournament top scorer with 3 goals in the 1995 King Fahd Cup (later renamed the Confederations Cup). He was selected to be part for the Mexico team for the 1998 FIFA World Cup, however he did not see action in the tournament.

He was selected as one of 3 overage players on the Mexico Olympic team at the 1996 Summer Olympics.

Retirement
After retiring, he picked up a commentator spot with TV Azteca. He left the job when he was offered the position of Vice-President of Monarcas Morelia. After leaving Morelia, He currently has returned to TV Azteca to his old job of a commentator in TV Azteca Sport Programs.

In 2011, García appear in film production Guerrero 12, a feature-length documentary examining soccer fandom passion. The film is directed by Miguel A. Reina, who was also responsible for the Sundance film Un aliado en el tiempo.

Garcia is also a Spanish color commentator for the North American version of Pro Evolution Soccer alongside TV Azteca commentator Christian Martinoli.

Personal life
García has been accused of domestic violence by his former wife, Kate del Castillo (married 2001–2004).

Honours

UNAM
Mexican Primera División: 1990–91
CONCACAF Champions' Cup: 1989

Mexico
CONCACAF Gold Cup: 1996

Individual
Mexican Primera División Golden Ball: 1990–91, 1991–92
Mexican Primera División Top Scorer: 1990–91, 1991–92, Invierno 1997
FIFA Confederations Cup Top Scorer: 1995
Copa América Top scorer: 1995

Career statistics

International goals

References

External links

 
 
 
 
   

1969 births
Living people
Mexican people of Spanish descent
Footballers from Mexico City
Association football forwards
Association football wingers
Mexican footballers
Mexico international footballers
CONCACAF Gold Cup-winning players
1991 CONCACAF Gold Cup players
1993 Copa América players
1994 FIFA World Cup players
1995 King Fahd Cup players
1995 Copa América players
1996 CONCACAF Gold Cup players
1997 FIFA Confederations Cup players
1998 FIFA World Cup players
Footballers at the 1996 Summer Olympics
Olympic footballers of Mexico
Club Universidad Nacional footballers
Atlético Madrid footballers
Real Sociedad footballers
Club América footballers
Atlante F.C. footballers
C.D. Guadalajara footballers
Atlético Morelia players
Club Puebla players
La Liga players
Mexican expatriate footballers
Expatriate footballers in Spain
Mexican expatriate sportspeople in Spain